Ghomrassen is a city of southeast  Tunisia located  from Tataouine and  from Medenine.

Administratively attached to the Tataouine, it is a municipality with 9,568 inhabitants at the 2014 Census. It is also the county seat of  delegation of the same name which had 18,335 inhabitants at the 2004 Census and 15,957 at the 2014 Census (National Institute of Statistics) and brings together, in addition to the city of Ghomrassen, the villages of Ksar Hadada, Oued El Khil, Elferch, Elhorria, and Ksar Elmorabitin Guermassa.

Geography
The majority of irrigation wells and the oasis disappeared with the urban development of the city.

Administratively, the city is divided into several sectors or Imad, whose authority is embodied by the omda, which can cover both urban and rural areas.

The city is divided into several districts: chare3 el joumhouriya, where the Market, a mosque sometimes considered the most luxurious historic city, Essned, the neighborhood where the primary school of March 2, and a mosque.

Ghomrassen is an Arabic speaking city, with many Amazigh words in the dialect. The accent is the southern Tunisian accent.

Etymology 
Its name comes from the Berber roots ghom for "tribe" or "chief". A myth told by the inhabitants of Ghomrassen indicates that the city name comes from two words, Ghom Rassi نغم راسي, given by one seven brothers from the region of el-Hamra Seguia (northern Western Sahara) to 15th century to populate the south-east of Tunisia and from the confederation of Werguemma كنفدرالية ورغمة. This brother had settled in the location of the future Ghomrassen he later founded, while his brothers were scattered in the southeast of the country to achieve the key groups of people in the region: Wederni الودرني and Jlidi الجليدي founded Tataouine, Touzni التوزني Medenine and Ben Gardane, Houioui الحويوي Beni Khedach and Khzouli الخزولي Umm Ettemr. Finally, Tarhouni الترهوني is partly Libya and founded the city of Tarhounah.

References

Populated places in Tataouine Governorate
Communes of Tunisia